Hypostomus atropinnis is a species of catfish in the family Loricariidae. It is native to South America, where it occurs in the Araguaia River basin, which itself is part of the Tocantins River drainage. The species reaches 21 cm (8.3 inches) in total length and is believed to be a facultative air-breather.

References 

Fish described in 1890
Hypostominae